Tubulin beta-2A chain is a protein that in humans is encoded by the TUBB2A gene.

References

Further reading